Rhidorroch (Scottish Gaelic: An Ruigh Dhorcha) is a deer forest east of Ullapool, Ross-shire, Scotland, centred on the extended catchment of the Ullapool River. It is divided into two farms and sporting estates: Rhidorroch Estate and East Rhidorroch Estate.

References

External links
 
 

Deer hunting
Forests and woodlands of Scotland